Solomon USD 393 is a public unified school district headquartered in Solomon, Kansas, United States.  The district includes the communities of Solomon, New Cambria, Niles, Verdi, and nearby rural areas.

Schools
The school district operates the following schools:
 Solomon High School - 9 to 12
 Solomon Elementary School - PreK to 8

See also
 Kansas State Department of Education
 Kansas State High School Activities Association
 List of high schools in Kansas
 List of unified school districts in Kansas

References

External links
 

School districts in Kansas
Education in Saline County, Kansas